The 2006 MTV Movie Awards were held on Saturday, June 3, 2006, and were hosted by Jessica Alba, with it being broadcast on June 8 on tape delay. It featured performances by Christina Aguilera, AFI and Gnarls Barkley. In addition to the below awards, MTV gave lifetime achievement awards to Jim Carrey (The MTV Generation Award) and Spike Lee (The Silver Bucket of Excellence, for Do the Right Thing).
MTV held its 15th annual movie awards show on Saturday, June 3, at the Sony Pictures Studios in Culver City, California. It was the final time Tenth Planet Productions produced the awards, and Joel Gallen was the executive-producer and director for the 12th and final consecutive year.

This is also the second MTV Movie Awards show to have a host win an award. The first show was in 2004 with Lindsay Lohan winning an award. The host for the MTV Movie Awards in 2006 was Jessica Alba. Christina Aguilera performed, for the first time, her lead single of her latest release Back to Basics, "Ain't No Other Man". 
Pre-recorded parodies include The Da Vinci Code, Mission: Impossible III, and King Kong.

Performers
 AFI – "Miss Murder"
 Christina Aguilera – "Ain't No Other Man"
 Gnarls Barkley – "Crazy"

Presenters
 Brandon Routh, Kate Bosworth, and Kevin Spacey – presented Best Hero
 Amanda Bynes and Anna Faris – presented Best Breakthrough Performance
 Colin Farrell and Jamie Foxx – presented Best Fight
 Justin Timberlake and Eva Mendes – presented Best Kiss
 Borat Sagdiyev – introduced Gnarls Barkley
 Matt Dillon, Kate Hudson, and Owen Wilson – presented Best Villain
 Famke Janssen and Rebecca Romijn – presented Sexiest Performance
 Adam Sandler and Kate Beckinsale – presented Best Performance
 Rosario Dawson and Chris "Ludacris" Bridges – presented Best Frightened Performance
 T.I. – introduced Christina Aguilera
 Will Ferrell as Ricky Bobby and John C. Reilly as Cal Naughton, Jr. – presented Best Comedic Performance
 LL Cool J – presented Silver Bucket of Excellence Award
 Keanu Reeves and Sandra Bullock – presented Best On-Screen Team
 Jessica Simpson and Dane Cook – introduced AFI
 Will Ferrell – presented MTV Generation Award
 Zach Braff – resented mtvU Student Filmmaker Award
 Samuel L. Jackson – presented Best Movie

Awards

MTV Generation Award
 Jim Carrey

Silver Bucket of Excellence
 Do the Right Thing

References

External links 
 BBC article BBC.co.uk
 Finanzen.net article Finanzen.net

2006
Mtv Movie Awards
MTV Movie Awards
2006 in Los Angeles
2006 in American cinema